This is a list of Billboard magazine's Top Hot 100 songs of 1990.

See also
1990 in music
List of Billboard Hot 100 number-one singles of 1990
List of Billboard Hot 100 top-ten singles in 1990

References

1990 record charts
Billboard charts